PT Pertamina (Persero), formerly abbreviated from Perusahaan Pertambangan Minyak dan Gas Bumi Negara (lit. 'State Oil and Natural Gas Mining Company'), is an Indonesian state-owned oil and natural gas corporation based in Jakarta. It was created in August 1968 by the merger of Pertamin (established 1961) and Permina (established 1957). In 2020, the firm was the third-largest crude oil producer in Indonesia behind US-based companies ExxonMobil's Mobil Cepu Ltd and Chevron Pacific Indonesia. In 2013, Pertamina was included for the first time in the Fortune Global 500 list of companies, ranked at 122 with revenues of $70.9 billion, it was also the sole Indonesian company to be featured in the list. According to the 2020 Fortune list, Pertamina is the largest company in Indonesia.

History

Nationalization
In 1957, Royal Dutch/Shell's assets in Indonesia (trading as Bataafse Petroleum Maatschappij) were nationalised, from which Permina was founded as a state-owned oil monopoly, headed by Lieutenant-General Ibnu Sutowo. Ibnu Sutowo's position as the second deputy of Abdul Haris Nasution was the beginning of the armed forces' involvement in the oil industry. Permina distributed oil for the entire archipelago.

Permina founded the Apprentice Technical School (Sekolah Kader Teknik) in Brandan to train and produce experts in the field. To meet this goal Permina established the Oil Academy in Bandung in 1962. Oil Academy's curriculum pertains to the technical aspects of the oil industry, and the graduates became the main forces of Pertamin (which later transformed to Pertamina).

In 1960, the Provisional People's Consultative Assembly enacted a policy that the mining of Indonesian oil and ground gases are only permitted for the state, through a state-administered company. Pertamin, established in 1961, was responsible for the administration, management and controlling of the exploration and production. The policy was short-lived. An agreement between the state and foreign companies was affirmed that gradually, oil refinery manufactures and other assets in marketing and distribution were to be sold to Indonesia within five to fifteen years.

In 1968, to consolidate the oil and gas industry for its management, exploration, marketing and distribution, Permina and Pertamin merged and became PN. Pertamina. It continued to do little drilling itself but made production-sharing agreements with foreign companies.

The 1970s
After the merge, Pertamina's production rose considerably (about 15% each in 1968 and 1969, and nearly 20% in 1973). By the end of 1973, it directly produced 28.2% of Indonesia's oil, with agreements of Caltex and Stanvac to produce the rest (67.8% and 3.6%, respectively). Its assets included seven refineries, oil terminals, 116 tankers, 102 other vessels and an airline. It was also active in cement, fertiliser, liquid natural gas, steel, hospitals, real estate, a rice estate, and telecommunications.

The 1974 oil price increases produced revenues of $4.2 billion in that year, equivalent to approximately one-sixth of Indonesia's gross domestic product. Much of this revenue was used by Sutowo to expand Pertamina's interests far beyond oil production to include investments in oil tankers, steel and construction. Pertamina built the Bina Graha, the presidential executive office building in Jakarta. The global oil crisis of the 1970s greatly increased oil prices and profits. Pertamina initially provided a fiscal lift to the hopes of Indonesia's development planners.

For President Suharto and other members of the ruling elite revenue from Pertamina was "an ongoing source of funding" without accountability. "They ran this cash-cow into the ground, using it for both military and personal ends." Historian Adrian Vickers describes the endemic corruption at Pertamina:
At each stage of the transaction chain, somebody was getting a percentage... If accidents occurred, as in 1972 when eighty impoverished people died... they could be covered up.
 
In 1973, the government's ability to borrow money from overseas was constrained, and Pertamina was no longer providing revenues to the state. Instead, the massive enterprise turned out not to be making money but compiling exponentially large losses. In February 1975, Pertamina could no longer pay its American and Canadian creditors. An investigation followed, which revealed over US$10 billion in debts, mismanagement, and corruption within the company. This debt was equivalent to approximately thirty per cent of Indonesia's GNP at the time. Others offer a figure of a $15 billion debt. A public investigation hurt the reputation of the national elite both among Indonesians and foreigners. The charges against Ibnu Sutowo were dismissed. Ibnu Sutowo and his family were among the richest and most powerful in Indonesia, into the 21st century. The government took over the operation of the company and sought means by which to repay its debts. Pertamina's debt problems were eventually solved through a large government bail-out, which nearly doubled Indonesia's foreign debt.

Since the 1980s

Human rights observers have long expressed concerns about Indonesia's hostility to labour unions. According to the Multinational Monitor: "In 1985, the government ordered the firing of over 1,600 workers at Pertamina and foreign oil companies, charging that they had been members of the Indonesian Communist Party, which had been permanently banned 19 years earlier when Suharto took power."

In 2003 Pertamina legally became PT PERTAMINA (Persero), as per the enactment of Government Regulation No.31/2003. Pertamina is now under the coordinator of the State Minister of State-owned Enterprises.

Like other contractors, Pertamina holds a Cooperation Contract with the Oil and Gas Regulatory Body. With its transformation into a limited company, Pertamina has become a business entity with the main target of making a profit.

President directors
During the 1970s, until 1976, the president director of Pertamina was Ibnu Sutowo, a well-known figure in Indonesia. Since then, there have been a number of president directors. Recent president directors have included the following:

Facilities

Refineries
Pertamina has not built any new refineries since the Balongan refinery was opened in West Java in the mid-1990s.

PTT Public Company Limited and Pertamina signed into partnership to build a new petrochemical complex in Indonesia for an estimated cost of US $4 to 5 billion.

Source: Indonesian Ministry of Energy and Resources, 2012 Handbook of Energy and Economic Statistics of Indonesia.
(Note: By world standards, none of Indonesia's refineries are large.

There are several other refineries in Indonesia which Pertamina has responsibilities for:

Source: Indonesian Ministry of Energy and Resources, 2012 Handbook of Energy and Economic Statistics of Indonesia.

In addition to the refineries which Pertamina owns, Pertamina has invested in two operating companies that manage output from LNG plants.

 PT Badak LNG operates a plant in Bontang, East Kalimantan, with 8 trains having a total capacity of 22.5 million tons per annum.
 PT Donggi Senoro LNG in Uso Village, Batui Subdistrict, Banggai Regency, Central Sulawesi Province, with 1 train with a capacity of 2 million tons per annum.
Pertamina also invested in the PT Arun 6 LNG trains near Lhokseumawe, Aceh, which had a total capacity of 12.5 million tons per annum. They closed down due to a lack of feed gas in 2014, and now Arun has used an LNG import terminal.

The first facility was planned to be built by Pertamina in partnership with Kuwait Petroleum, while the second was expected to be built by Pertamina in co-operation with Saudi Aramco. Total investment was expected to be around $20 billion. One main problem holding up an agreement to build the refineries was the issue of financial concessions to be provided for the foreign investors. Eventually, in September 2013 it was announced that the plans for the first refinery had been cancelled. At the same time, the government said that there were plans for yet a different refinery project which would be constructed solely by Pertamina and funded by the state. The crude oil for this alternative project was expected to be supplied from Iraq.

Pertamina also has two gas reserves and a petrochemical company. Pertamina's products include a great variety of fuels, chemicals, additives, and retail products.

Petrol pumps
Pertamina is the largest distribution network of petroleum products (gas stations, etc.) in Indonesia.

Bright Convenience Store
Along with the gas stations, Pertamina also has a convenience store chain, integrated with their gas stations. The development of Bright convenience stores and cafes is self-governed by PT Pertamina Retail.

Subsidiaries

These are 27 subsidiaries of Pertamina based on Pertamina Annual Report 2016.

 Pertamina EP

PT Pertamina EP (PEP) is engaged in managing upstream oil and gas production through more manageable exploration and exploitation activities. Adding to that, PEP has been undertaking other supporting businesses, which have been intended to back up the main business directly or indirectly.

Pertamina EP Working Areas of 140.000 km2 were once largely PT Pertamina (Persero)’s Oil and Gas Mining Authority Zone. The working areas are managed through its own operation and partnership co-operation.

Pertamina EP Working Areas consist of five assets. The operation of those assets comprise 19 Field Areas, namely Rantau, Pangkalan Susu, Lirik, Jambi and Ramba in Asset 1, Prabumulih, Adera, Limau and Pendopo in Asset 2, Tambun, Subang and Jatibarang in Asset 3, Cepu in Asset 4 as well as Sangatta, Sangasanga, Bunyu, Tarakan, Tanjung and Papua in Asset 5.

Besides the management of working areas as stated earlier, other business patterns include management through projects, such as Pondok Makmur Development Project in West Java, Paku Gajah Development Project in South Sumatera, Jawa Gas Development Project in Central Java, and Matindok Gas Development Project in Central Sulawesi.

 Pertamina Gas

Pertamina established PT Pertagas on 23 February 2007, and it became PT Pertamina Gas in 2008. The company undertakes gas transportation, trading and processing. 
In the gas transmission business, Pertamina owns a gas pipeline network with a total volume of 34,000 km-inches in Northern Sumatra, Central Sumatra, Southern Sumatra, Western Java, Eastern Java, and East Kalimantan

In January 2009, PT Pertamina Gas obtained a Transportation Permit and in February 2009, it received an exclusive right from BPH Migas for gas transportation along 43 transmission routes. These permits and exclusive rights complemented the business permit that had been issued previously (in September 2008). By obtaining a business license and special rights, PT Pertamina Gas now has a regulatory basis to play the principal role in the gas business in Indonesia.

 Pertamina Geothermal Energy

PGE was founded on 12 December 2006. This Pertamina subsidiary carries out geothermal exploration and exploitation in 15 working areas (WKP) in Indonesia, namely: Sibayak-Sinabung, Sibual-buali–Sarulla, Sungai Penuh-Sumurup, Tambang Sawah-Hululais, Lumut Balai, Waypanas-Ulubelu, Cibereum-Parabakti, Pengalengan (Patuha-Wayang Windu), Kamojang-Darajat, Karaha-Telagabodas, Dieng, Iyang-Argopuro, Tabanan-Bali, Lahendong-Tompaso and Kotamobagu.

 Pertamina EP Cepu

PEP Cepu, which was established on 14 September 2005, is a subsidiary of PT Pertamina (Persero) that focuses on the upstream oil and gas business. In the Cepu Block, Pertamina has a 45% interest in partnership with Mobil Cepu Ltd (as the operator) and the Regional Owned Enterprise (BUMD) that manages the KKS for the Cepu Block.

 Pertamina Drilling Services Indonesia

PT PDSI was established on 13 June 2008 as a drilling service management business entity. 
The services provided comprise drilling, workover activities, and drilling services that use a Daily Rate and Integrated Drilling Management (MPT) system for oil, gas, and geothermal wells.
 
Presently, PT PDSI owns 34 drilling rigs (28 owned by PT PDSI and 6 transferred from PT Usayana)

 Pertamina Hulu Energy

PHE is one of the Upstream Directorate subsidiaries working in the oil and gas upstream business and is also an upstream business vehicle for managing the domestic and overseas co-operation portfolio in the form of Production Sharing Contracts (PSC), Joint Operating Body-Production Sharing Contracts (JOB-PSC), Indonesian Participating / Pertamina Participating Interests (IP/PPI) and Badan Operasi Bersama (BOB). PHE’s overseas working areas covered: Western Desert Block 3, Iraq; Block 10 & 11.1, Offshore South Vietnam; Block SK-305, Offshore Sarawak, Malaysia; Sabratah 17-3 Block, Offshore Libya; Sirte 123-3 Block, Libya; Block 13, Red Sea, Offshore Sudan; Block-3, Offshore Qatar; and Basker Manta Gummy Block, Australia.

 Pertamina Internasional EP

Pertamina Internasional Eksplorasi dan Produksi (PIEP) is established on 18 November 2013, based on the need for international asset management that is focused on overseas assets of PT Pertamina (Persero).

 Pertamina EP Cepu ADK

PT Pertamina EP Cepu ADK hereinafter referred to as PEPC ADK was established on 15 August 2013 in order to manage Fields of Alas Dara and Kemuning (ADK). Following the prevailing rules and legislation in the Ministry of Energy and Mineral Resources, the PSC between SKKMigas and PEPC ADK was signed on 26 February 2014. PEPC ADK is the operator of Alas Dara and Kemuning, located in Blora, Central Java, which was previously operated by Mobil Cepu Ltd. (MCL). In line with the commitment to the Government, PEPC ADK shall conduct Well Re-entry, Perform G&G Study, GGR Study, and exploration drilling. Since established, the PEPC ADK has never changed its name.

 ConocoPhillips Algeria Ltd

ConocoPhillips Algeria Ltd. owns three onshore oil fields. The company is based in Algeria. As of 27 November 2013, ConocoPhillips Algeria Ltd. operates as a subsidiary of PT Pertamina (Persero).

 Pertamina Gas Negara

 Pertamina Power Indonesia
 Pertamina Patra Niaga
 Pertamina Trans Kontinental
 Pertamina Retail
 Pertamina Lubricants
 Pertamina Internasional Shipping
 Pertamina Training & Consulting
 Patra Jasa
 Pertamina Bina Medika
 Pelita Air Service
 Pertamina Dana Ventura
 Elnusa, Tbk.
 Pertamina Internasional Timor S.A.
 Pertamina Hulu Indonesia
 Pertamina East Natuna
 Pertamina Energy Trading Limited
 Pertamina E&P Libya
Tugu Pratama Indonesia
Pratama Mitra Sejati

Products
There are various PERTAMINA products consisting of fuel (BBM), non-fuel, gas, petrochemical products, and lubricants.

Fuel (BBM)

Fuel Products: 
 Kerosene
 HSD (High-Speed Diesel)
 MDF (Marine Diesel Fuel)
 MFO (Marine Fuel Oil)
 Motor Gasoline (e.g. Premium 88 and Solar)

Special Fuel 

Special Fuel products:

 Aviation Gasoline
 Aviation Turbine Fuel
 Pertalite (RON 90)
 Pertamax (RON 92)
 Pertamax Turbo (RON 98)
 Pertamax Racing (RON 100)
 Solar/Bio Solar (CN 48, Sulfur 3.500 ppm) 
 Dexlite (CN 51, Sulfur 1.200 ppm) 
 Pertamina Dex (CN 53, Sulfur 300 ppm) 

Non-Fuel (Non-BBM)

Non Fuel Products:

 Asphalt
 Calcined Coke
 Green Coke
 Heavy Aromate
 Paraffin Wax
 Solvent
 Lube Base Oil
 Slack Wax

Lube Base Oil

Pertamina’s Lube Base Oil Products based on their function:

 Automotive Gear Oil
 Circulating Oils
 Heavy-Duty Diesel Engine Oils
 Industrial and Marine Engine Oils
 Industrial and Hydraulic Oils
 Passenger Car Oils
 Powershift Transmissions and Heavy Equipment Hydraulic Oils
 Refrigerating Oils
 Two-Stroke Gasoline Engine Oils

Gas

Gas products include:
 LPG (Liquefied Petroleum Gas) 
 Gas Fuel (BBG) 
 Musicool (Substitute refrigerant for CFC, with low pollution and environmentally friendly)

Petrochemical

Petrochemical products include:
 Benzene
 Paraxylene
 Polypropylene
 Pure Terephthalic Acid (PTA)
 Sulfur

Financial summary
Pertamina: Summary balance sheet as at 31 December 2016

2016 data:

Total sales: $36.5 billion
Gross profit: $8.5 billion
Net profit: $3.2 billion

Source: Pertamina website, Annual Reports.

Commercial automotive partnerships
Pertamina is an official recommended fuel and lubricants partner for Lamborghini for automobiles since 2015.

Sports sponsorships

From 2006-2007, Pertamina became the main sponsor for Doni Tata Pradita in Yamaha Team who raced in the MotoGP 125cc class. And in 2008-2009 seasons, again became a sponsor for Doni Tata Pradita who promote to MotoGP 250cc category.

Then starting the 2021 season, Pertamina collaborated with the Mandalika Racing Team and SAG Team to compete in the Moto2 category with Bo Bendsneyder and Thomas Lüthi as the racers.

Rio Haryanto, Indonesia's first Formula One driver, was sponsored by Pertamina throughout his junior career and played a pivotal role in securing his drive with the Manor Racing team in 2016. The company also sponsors Formula Two team Arden through its Indonesian driver, Sean Gelael, as well as being a primary backer of the Lamborghini Super Trofeo Asia Championship. Pertamina also sponsored Italian automotive giants Lamborghini since 2015 as an official global lubricant partner.

Pertamina is main sponsor for Mandalika International Street Circuit and Indonesian motorcycle Grand Prix.

References

External links

  

 
Companies based in Jakarta
Oil and gas companies of Indonesia
Indo
Government-owned companies of Indonesia
Non-renewable resource companies established in 1957
Indonesian brands
Biodiesel producers
Automotive fuel retailers
Energy companies established in 1957
Indonesian companies established in 1957